Kotlov is a Russian masculine surname, its feminine counterpart is Kotlova. Notable people with the surname include:

 Nikita Kotlov (born 1991), American soccer player
Yevgeny Kotlov (1949–2016), Soviet hockey player

Russian-language surnames